OpenVera was a hardware verification language developed by System Science and acquired by Synopsys.

See also
 e (verification language)
 SystemVerilog

References

External links

Hardware verification languages